Percy Jones (23 March 1887 – 31 March 1969) was a Welsh international rugby union forward who played club rugby for Pontypool and Newport. He was awarded eight caps for Wales and faced the touring with South Africans. Jones was one of the 'Terrible Eight' who clashed with the Irish forwards during the 1914 Five Nations Championship.

Rugby career
Jones played for several rugby clubs but was selected for Welsh international duty while with Newport and Pontypool. His first cap was against the 1912 touring South Africans and although Wales lost the game, he was reselected a few months later to face England in the 1913 Five Nations Championship. Under the captaincy of Tommy Vile, Wales lost on home soil for the first time against England since 1895. The selectors kept faith with Jones, and played in two of the next three games of the tournament, which saw wins for Wales and Jones against Scotland and France.

In 1914, Jones was selected to play in all four matches of that year's Championship. Wales only lost one game, narrowly against eventually Grand Slam champions England. Jones was best known during this campaign for the buildup to the match against Ireland. The match was to be played at the Balmoral Showgrounds in Belfast on 14 March, and  the Welsh team had travelled out to Ireland the day before. Jones and fellow Newport team mate Harry Uzzell decided to visit a local theatre in the night before the match. There they were met by some of the Irish players, where they were approached by Ireland's William Tyrrell, later to become Air Vice Marshal Sir William Tyrell, Surgeon to George VI, who challenged Jones to a physical contest on the pitch the next day. What appeared to start as good natured banter turned into a full-blooded contest during the match. Jones took several early knocks, not just from Tyrrell but from other members of the Irish pack. At half time Uzzell decided to pay the Irish back and the game descended into running fist fights and the match is remembered as being one of the most violent in international rugby. The Welsh forwards were dubbed the 'Terrible Eight' by the press after the event.

International matches played
Wales
  1913, 1914
  1913, 1914
  1914
  1913, 1914
  1912

Bibliography

References

1887 births
1969 deaths
Caerphilly RFC players
London Welsh RFC players
Newport RFC players
Rugby union players from Pontypridd
Pontypool RFC players
Rhydyfelin RFC players
Rugby union locks
Tredegar RFC players
Treorchy RFC players
Wales international rugby union players
Welsh rugby union players